Marshland High School is a mixed secondary school in the King's Lynn and West Norfolk District of Norfolk, England, and in the village of West Walton (near Wisbech).

Description
Previously a foundation school administered by Norfolk County Council, Marshland High School converted to academy status in November 2015, however the school continues to coordinate with Norfolk County Council for admissions. It is part of the West Norfolk Academies Trust.

In 2018, Marshland received a 'good' rating from Ofsted.

Curriculum
Virtually all maintained schools and academies follow the National Curriculum, and are inspected by Ofsted on how well they succeed in delivering a 'broad and balanced curriculum'.

Key Stage 3 
The school, Marshland, decided in 2016 that Key Stage 3 should contains years 7, and 8 as pupils would be better served by doing a three-year exam-focused Key Stage 4. The increasing number of students entering the school  with very poor literacy skills and social skills is a concern.

Key Stage 4
Key Stage 4 contains years 9, 10 and eleven. Approximately 60% of the teaching time is dedicated to the core curriculum. Student will study GCSEs in: English Language and English Literature, Mathematics and either a double award trilogy science course or a triple award separate sciences. 
Additional time is given to the following non-examined subjects: Core PE (non-examined) and Skills for Life.

Students are then offered 4 optional subjects which leads to a GSCE or a BTEC Level 2 vocational qualification. German and French are the languages offered.

Notable alumni

Neil Shephard, Frank B. Baird, Jr. Professor of Science in the Department of Economics and the Department of Statistics at Harvard University, studied at the school.

References

External links
 UK government inspection report on Marshland High School
 News report about John Bennett's intended departure

Secondary schools in Norfolk
Academies in Norfolk